Falanthos is a former municipality in Arcadia, Peloponnese, Greece. Since the 2011 local government reform it is part of the municipality Tripoli, of which it is a municipal unit. The municipal unit has an area of 208.545 km2. In 2011 its population was 402.

Subdivisions
The municipal unit Falanthos is subdivided into the following communities (constituent villages in brackets):
Alonistaina
Chrysovitsi (Chrysovitsi, Manteika)
Mainalo
Piana
Roeino
Silimna
Tselepakos (Tselepakos, Davia, Kato Davia)

Population

References

External links
Falanthos at the GTP Travel Pages

Populated places in Arcadia, Peloponnese